The Cook Islands competed in the Olympic Games for the first time at the 1988 Summer Olympics in Seoul, South Korea.  The Cook Islands Sports and National Olympic Committee was formed and recognized in 1986.

Competitors
The following is the list of number of competitors in the Games.

Athletics

Men

Women

Boxing

Weightlifting

Men

References

Official Olympic Reports

Nations at the 1988 Summer Olympics
1988
1988 in the Cook Islands